Mohammad Yazbek (born 1950) is a Lebanese cleric. He is one of the Hezbollah founders and the head of the Sharia or religious council of the organization.

Early life and education
Yazbek hails from a family based in Bodai, a town near Baalbek in northern Lebanon. He born there in 1950. He studied theology in Najaf, Iraq, as a pupil of Mohammad Baqr Al Sadr.

Career
After completing his studies in Iraq, Yazbek returned to Lebanon in 1980. He actively contributed to the establishment of khawzas, Shiite religious institutions, in Lebanon. He was a member of Amal movement before his involvement in the foundation of Hezbollah. 

Abbas Musawi, Subhi Tufayli and Yazbek, all from the Bekaa valley, founded Hezbollah in 1982. Yazbek supported the revolt of Tufayli in 1987 against the power inequality in Hezbollah in favor of those, who hail from southern Lebanon. Then Yazbek became a senior Hezbollah leader in the Bekaa valley in the 1990s. He issues fatwas in regard to the activities of Hezbollah one of which was in 2006 concerning the production of the exact copies of Captagon by the group. Through this fatwa its production and sale were allowed, but the fatwa also required that it should not be consumed by any hezbollah member. 

Yazbek is the representative of supreme leader of Iran, Ali Khamenei, in the Bekaa valley. He is responsible for distributing the financial grants allocated by Khamenei's office to Hezbollah. In addition, Yazbek is the special representative of Hezbollah's secretary general Sayyed Hassan Nasrallah and a member of Hezbollah's supreme council, exclusive shura council. In 2009, Yazbek was again elected to the shura council. He also heads the Sharia council of Hezbollah, which is also known as higher legal committee.

Views
Yazbek praised the bombing of the barracks of the Marine peacekeepers in Beirut on 23 October 1983 which killed 241 U.S. military members reporting that it shaked America’s throne and France’s might. He also added "Let America and Israel know that we have a lust for martyrdom and that our motto is being turned into reality." He employs an analogy between the Battle of the Camel, first civil war among Muslims, and Hezbollah's use of arms in an attempt to make the armed attacks of Hezbollah legitimate. In 2012 he led to tensions when he revived a historical controversy between Sunnis and Shiites publicly criticising Aisha who was the third spouse of Prophet Mohammad.

Assassination attempt and sanctions
On 9 December 2005, Yazbek escaped an assassination attempt unhurt in Baalbek. The bomb blast outside his home caused no casualties.

In May 2017 Yazbek was subject to the sanctions imposed by the U.S. and some of Arab countries, including Saudi Arabia, the United Arab Emirates and Bahrain in addition to other nine senior Hezbollah figures.

References

External links

20th-century Lebanese people
21st-century Lebanese people
1950 births
Hezbollah founders
Living people
People from Baalbek District
Survivors of terrorist attacks
Amal Movement politicians
Lebanese Shia clerics